Events from the year 1953 in Scotland.

Incumbents 

 Secretary of State for Scotland and Keeper of the Great Seal – James Stuart

Law officers 
 Lord Advocate – James Latham Clyde
 Solicitor General for Scotland – William Rankine Milligan

Judiciary 
 Lord President of the Court of Session and Lord Justice General – Lord Cooper
 Lord Justice Clerk – Lord Thomson
 Chairman of the Scottish Land Court – Lord Gibson

Events 
 30 January – The cargo vessel Clan MacQuarrie runs aground near Borve, Lewis in a storm; all 66 crew are rescued by breeches buoy the following morning.
 31 January – The car ferry , sailing from Stranraer to Larne in Northern Ireland, sinks in the Irish Sea in a storm killing 133 people on board. Fleetwood trawler Michael Griffiths sinks seven miles south of Barra Head with the loss of 13 crew.
 9 February – Fraserburgh life-boat John and Charles Kennedy capsizes on service: six crew killed.
 5 March – , the last full-size paddle steamer built in the UK, is launched on the River Clyde at A. & J. Inglis's Pointhouse Shipyard. On 25 May, she enters excursion service on Loch Lomond.
 c. March – New Bridge Street Bridge across Peterhead harbour completed, the last Scherzer rolling lift bridge erected by Sir William Arrol & Co. of Glasgow.
 16 April – The Queen launches the Royal Yacht Britannia at John Brown & Company shipbuilders at Clydebank.
 20 May – Celtic F.C. beat Hibernian 2-0 in the final of the Coronation Cup (football) at Hampden Park.
 20 June – Most of the population of the island of Soay, Skye, moves to the Isle of Mull.
 24 June – First state visit of Queen Elizabeth II to Scotland since her accession; the Honours of Scotland are carried before the monarch for the first time since 1822 and presented to her at St Giles' Cathedral, Edinburgh.
 22 July – Great Bernera is connected to Lewis by Scotland's first prestressed concrete girder bridge.
 8 August – The northbound Royal Scot train derails near Abington descending from Beattock Summit due to buckling of track caused by high temperature; 37 are injured.
 27 October – Arbroath life-boat Robert Lindsay capsizes on service: six crew killed.
 Scottish law case of MacCormick v Lord Advocate decides that the right of Elizabeth II to so style herself in Scotland is a matter of royal prerogative.
 IBM establishes a manufacturing facility in Greenock.

Births 
 1 January – Maureen Beattie, Irish-born actress
 6 January – Malcolm Young, rock guitarist (died 2017 in Australia)
 11 January – John Sessions, born John Gibb Marshall, actor and comedian (died 2020)
 20 January – John Robertson, international footballer
 27 February – Gavin Esler, television journalist
 6 May
 Tony Blair, Prime Minister of the United Kingdom, 1997-2007
 Graeme Souness, international footballer and manager
 19 May – Patrick Hodge, lawyer, a Justice of the Supreme Court of the United Kingdom
 21 May – Jim Devine, Labour politician
 22 May – Andy Nisbet, mountaineer (died 2019)
 23 May – Ronald Frame, fiction writer
 7 June 
Colin Boyd, Baron Boyd of Duncansby, lawyer and judge
Dougie Donnelly, television presenter
 23 June – John Stahl, actor (died 2022)
 24 August – Sam Torrance, golfer
 31 August – Jimmy McKenna, actor
 8 September – John McGlynn, actor
 10 September – John Thurso, born John Sinclair, businessman and Liberal Democrat politician
 28 September – Jim Diamond, pop singer-songwriter (died 2015)
 21 October – Eric Faulkner, pop musician
 4 November – Derek Johnstone, international footballer
 12 November – Calum MacDonald, Celtic rock songwriter and percussionist
 22 December – Gregor Fisher, actor and comedian
 Ian Read, businessman

Deaths 
 19 March – Thomas Hunter, Unionist Party politician and Member of Parliament (MP) for Perth (born 1872)
 1 June – Alex James, international footballer (born 1901)
 23 July – Sir Thomas Jaffrey, actuary (born 1861)
 30 September – Lewis Fry Richardson, mathematical physicist (born 1881 in England)

The arts
 April – Comedy film Laxdale Hall is released.
 Lewis Spence's Collected Poems are published in Edinburgh.

See also 
 1953 in Northern Ireland

References 

 
Scotland
Years of the 20th century in Scotland
1950s in Scotland